Pulpit Rock may refer to:

Preikestolen, a cliff in Norway
Pulpit Rock (Isle of Portland), an extremity on the Isle of Portland, Dorset
Pulpit Rock (The Dalles, Oregon), a rock in Oregon
Pulpit Rock (Cape Schanck),  Mornington Peninsula, Victoria, Australia 
 Pulpit Rock, a significant rocky outcrop visible from Bundanon, New South Wales, Australia
Pulpit Rock Tower, historic military observation tower on the Atlantic coast in New Hampshire
Pulpit Rocks, National Historic Landmark near Huntingdon, Pennsylvania

See also
Pulpit (disambiguation)